"Slippin'" is a song by American rapper DMX, released as the first single from his second studio album Flesh of My Flesh, Blood of My Blood (1998). The song peaked at #30 on the UK Singles Chart, and at #60 on the U.S. Billboard Hot R&B/Hip-Hop Songs. The song samples "Moonstreams" by Grover Washington Jr. from the 1975 album Feel So Good.

This song includes background vocals from future American Idol contestant Tamyra Gray.

Music video
The song's music video portrays DMX's youth. In 2018, DMX's attorneys showed the video to Judge Jed S. Rakoff in an effort to persuade Rakoff to be lenient when sentencing DMX for tax evasion; Rakoff responded by sentencing DMX to only one year in prison, instead of the five years requested by prosecutors.

Chart performance

Certifications

References

1998 songs
1998 singles
DMX (rapper) songs
Ruff Ryders Entertainment singles
Def Jam Recordings singles
Songs written by DMX (rapper)